Changkat Kruing is a small village in Manjung District, Perak, Malaysia.

This small village is located between Ayer Tawar and Pantai Remis which is 20 km from Ayer Tawar and 14 km from Pantai Remis. Dinding River passes by the village. The majority ethnic group in this village is Chinese (FuZhou).

Economy
There is a Chinese primary school in the village - SJK (C) Khuen Hean, temple - Guang Fu Gong, Methodist church, mosque, polyclinic, bank (Agro Bank),  a few sundry shops and restaurants. Gong piang has sold in there.

Most of the residents were rubber tappers before the 1990s. In the recent years, Oil palm plantations are more prevalent due to the lucrativeness of this line of business. The locals hire foreign workers to harvest the crops instead of doing it themselves as they used to decades ago. Many locals accumulated great wealth from harvesting and selling palm oil. The price of land around Changkat Keruing have increased more than ten-fold since 2000.

In addition to other traditional agricultural plantations like mangoes, papayas and coconuts, locals are beginning to look towards fish and prawn farming as another source of income. However, there are several environmental concerns that flow from this practices.

Besides, the locals are beginning to invest into the bird's nest market. They do so by constructing 3 to 4 storey high buildings that resembles caves, home of the edible-nest swiftlet. These swiftlets nest in the buildings and their nests are then harvested for sale.

Local cuisine
People in this town would usually have noodle dishes for breakfast, for instance, noodles in braised soup (卤面), dried Chinese noodles (干捞), etc. Some other popular Malaysian dishes like asam laksa, curry noodles (咖哩面), and nasi lemak are enjoyed widely by people of this town. High temperatures experienced by the town year round has also made cooling desserts popular amongst the locals. Ice shavings like ais kacang, sweetened ice balls and other fruit juices greatly helps in relieving the searing heat.

As the majority of the population is of Fuzhou (福州) descent, the delicacies found in this town are heavily influenced by Fuzhou culture. For example, red wine chicken vermicelli (红酒鸡面线)，a dish unique to Fuzhou，is often prepared by the locals, especially during special occasions like birthdays.

References

Manjung District
Villages in Perak